Governor Wright may refer to:

Andrew Barkworth Wright (1895–1971), Governor of British Cyprus from 1949 to 1954 and Governor of the Gambia from 1947 to 1949
Fielding L. Wright (1895–1956), 49th and 50th Governor of Mississippi
James Wright (governor) (1716–1785), 7th Royal Governor of Carolina and Georgia from 1760 to 1776
Joseph A. Wright (1810–1867), 10th Governor of Indiana
Luke Edward Wright (1846–1922), Governor-General of the Philippines from 1904 to 1906
Robert Wright (Maryland politician) (1752–1826), 12th Governor of Maryland
Silas Wright (1795–1847), 14th Governor of New York

See also
SS Governor Wright, from List of shipwrecks in December 1941